Dulness is the goddess who presides over Alexander Pope's The Dunciad. She is the central character, introduced at the start of the work.

Dulness is the daughter of Chaos and "eternal Night", and her mission is to convert all the world to stupidity ("To hatch a new Saturnian age, of Lead"). As "enlightenment" moves ever westward, darkness follows behind. In Pope's poem, she already has control of all political writing and seeks to extend her reign to drama. Hence, she chooses as a champion Lewis Theobald (Dunciad A) and Colley Cibber (Dunciad B).

Pope presents the power of Dulness as inexorable and irresistible, and in Book IV of the Dunciad B he asks only that she pause a moment to let him write his poem before she takes "the singer and the song" into her oblivion. She is not motivated by any particular malice, and she even shows mercy at one point, if being reduced to insensibility is mercy, for, when a deflowered nun comes before her, she drops her cloak of shamelessness over the ruined woman. Instead, she has an essential antipathy toward learning and independent thinking, and, for Pope, loss of the ability to discern, to think, and to appreciate is a living death and the license of all evil.

For Pope, who was a Roman Catholic, absolute monarchy, foreign language opera, flattery, the replacement of sound architecture for politically well placed hacks, the redesign of good (classically ordered) buildings, and the money grubbing of what would now be called the tabloid press are all signs of the triumph of Dulness over reason and light. Each of these things represents choosing the less thoughtful over the more rational choice, each requires credulity and acceptance over curiosity and independence, and therefore Pope blames, at least as much as any agent of Dulness, an indifferent and uneducated public.

References

Fictional goddesses
1728 introductions